Progressive Democratic Party may refer to:

 Progressive Democratic Party of Afghanistan, founded 1966
 Progressive Democratic Party (Bangladesh), founded 2007
 Progressive Democratic Party (Gibraltar), 2006–2013
 Progressive Democratic Party of Guadeloupe, founded 1991
 Progressive Democratic Party (Kosovo), formed in 2014
 Progressive Democratic Party (Liberia), formed in 2005
 Progressive Democratic Party of the North, in Luxembourg, 1931–1937
 Progressive Democratic Party (Malaysia), formed in 2002 as Sarawak Progressive Democratic Party
 Progressive Democratic Party (Montserrat), 1970–1987
 Progressive Democratic Party (Paraguay), created in 2007
 Progressive Democrats, in Ireland, 1985–2009
 Progressive Democratic Party (Thailand), 2005–2007
 Progressive Democratic Party (Trinidad and Tobago), 1946–1956
 Progressive Democratic Party (Tunisia), 1983–2012
 Progressive Democratic Party (South Carolina), in the United States, 1944–1948
 Progressive Democratic Party (Spain), a Spanish conservative political party, founded in 1978

See also
 Democratic Progressive Party (disambiguation)
 Progressive Party (disambiguation)
 Progress Party (disambiguation)
 PDP (disambiguation)
 Lists of political parties